CVPS may refer to:
 Central Vermont Public Service a former electricity supplier in Vermont, United States
 City Vocational Public School, a school in Meerut, India
 Colégio Visconde de Porto Seguro, a school in São Paulo, Brazil